Farm name may refer to:
A name given to a farm.  See place name origins and toponymy.
Norske Gaardnavne is a 19-volume study of Norwegian farm names
A part of the full personal name which constitutes the name of a farm.
  for Scandinavian farm names
 Hofname for German farm names